Gordon Lockhart Bennett,  (October 10, 1912 – February 11, 2000) was a Canadian teacher, politician and the 21st Lieutenant Governor of Prince Edward Island.

Born in Charlottetown, Prince Edward Island, he received a Bachelor of Science in 1937 and a Master of Science in Chemistry in 1947 from Acadia University. He started to teach in a school and joined the faculty of the department of Chemistry at Prince of Wales College in 1939.

In March 1966, Bennett was elected president of the Dominion Curling Association, succeeding Frank Sargent.

In 1966, he was elected as a Liberal candidate as a representative of 5th Queens. He was re-elected in 1970 and 1974. From 1966 to 1974, he held ministerial positions in the government of Premier Alex Campbell including President of the Executive Council, Minister of Education, Minister of Justice, Provincial Secretary and Chairman of Provincial Centennial Commission.

He was Lieutenant Governor from October 24, 1974 to January 14, 1980.

He was inducted into Canadian Curling Hall of Fame as a builder.

In 1983, he was made an Officer of the Order of Canada. He was created a Knight of Grace of the Order of St. John in 1975.

References

 Government of Prince Edward Island, Canada biography

1912 births
2000 deaths
People from Charlottetown
Acadia University alumni
Knights of Grace of the Order of St John
Lieutenant Governors of Prince Edward Island
Members of the United Church of Canada
Officers of the Order of Canada
Prince Edward Island Liberal Party MLAs
Members of the Executive Council of Prince Edward Island
Curling Canada presidents